Brandon Tauszik (born 1986) is a photographer and filmmaker based in California.

In 2011, Tauszik began covering the doomsday prophesies of Harold Camping and the Family Radio ministry. In 2014, Tauszik pioneered GIF-based storytelling with "Tapered Throne", a portrait of Oakland's black barbers.

He has directed the music videos for rapper Antwon's "Helicopter" and "Living Every Dream", as well as producer RL Grime's "Heard Me".

References

Living people
American filmmakers
Photographers from California
1986 births